Yukshin Gardan Sar is a high peak in the Shimshal Valley, a village in the Karakoram range in Pakistan. Its height is also often given as 7,469 m (24,505 ft) or 7,641 m (25,069 ft). It lies about 16 km (10 mi) northeast of Khunyang Chhish and 6 km (3.75 mi) northwest of Kanjut Sar. It is flanked on the northwest by the Yazghil Glacier and on the northeast by the Yukshin Gardan Glacier; both drain into the Shimshal River. According to many residents of Shimshal, Yukshin Gardan Sar is the name of the adjacent peak Kanjut Sar, and vice versa. In Shimshal village, the original namings are widely accepted and used, as opposed to what is recognised internationally.

Yukshin Gardan Sar was first climbed in 1984, by a Pakistani-Austrian group, led by Rudolf Wurzer. They ascended via the South Ridge, which they accessed via the Yazghil Glacier on the west side of the peak.

The second ascent followed very shortly after the first, on July 23, 1984. A Pakistani-Japanese group that had been on the mountain simultaneously with the first ascent party switched from their unworkable North Ridge route to make an alpine style ascent of the first ascent route on the South Ridge.

The third ascent of the peak was in 1986, by a Spanish team comprising Alejandro Arranz, Iñaki Aldaya, Alfredo Zabalza, and Tomás Miguel. They used the same route as the first-ascent party. According to the Himalayan Index, there have been no other ascents or attempts on this peak since that time.

Notes
  This prominence figure is approximate.

References
 Jill Neate, High Asia: an illustrated history of the 7000 metre peaks, The Mountaineers, 1989.
 American Alpine Journal 1985, 1987.
 Jerzy Wala, Orographical Sketch Map of the Karakoram, Swiss Foundation for Alpine Research, 1990.

Mountains of Gilgit-Baltistan
Seven-thousanders of the Karakoram